The 2002 NFL draft was the 67th annual meeting of National Football League (NFL) franchises to select newly eligible football players. The draft is known officially as the "NFL Annual Player Selection Meeting" and has been conducted annually since 1936. The draft took place April 20–21, 2002 at the Theater at Madison Square Garden in New York City, New York. The draft was broadcast on ESPN both days and eventually moved to ESPN2. The draft began with the Houston Texans selecting David Carr, and it ended with the Texans selecting Mr. Irrelevant, Ahmad Miller. There were thirty-two compensatory selections distributed among eighteen teams, with the Buffalo Bills receiving the most selections with four. The University of Miami was the college most represented in the draft, having five of its players selected in the first round. Although the Carolina Panthers finished with a 1–15 record which would normally have given them the first pick in each round, the Houston Texans were given the first pick because they were an expansion team.  The league also held a supplemental draft after the regular draft and before the regular season.

The last remaining active player from the 2002 draft was third-round quarterback Josh McCown, who threw his last pass in 2019 for the Philadelphia Eagles.

Player selections

Trades
In the explanations below, (D) denotes trades that took place during the draft, while (PD) indicates trades completed pre-draft.

Round one

Round two

Round three

Round four

Round five

Round six

Round seven

Supplemental draft selections
For each player selected in the Supplemental Draft, the team forfeits its pick in that round in the draft of the following season.

Notable undrafted players

Hall of Famers

 Ed Reed, free safety from Miami (FL), taken 1st round 24th overall by the Baltimore Ravens.
Inducted: Professional Football Hall of Fame Class of 2019.

Notes

References
General references
 
 
 
 

Trade references

Specific references

External links
 

2002
NFL Draft
Draft
NFL draft
Madison Square Garden
NFL Draft
American football in New York City
2000s in Manhattan
Sporting events in New York City